The Political Movement "Social Democrats" (PDS) is a social-democratic political party in Bulgaria. It was previously part of the Coalition for Bulgaria, an alliance led by the Bulgarian Socialist Party. In the 2001 elections the coalition won 17.1% of the popular vote and 48 out of 240 seats. At the legislative elections on 25 June 2005, the Coalition won 34.2% of the popular vote and 82 out of 240 seats. The party joined the electoral coalition We Continue the Change to compete in the November 2021 Bulgarian election.

External links
Official web site

2000 establishments in Bulgaria
Political parties established in 2000
Social democratic parties in Bulgaria